RWP can refer to:-

 Rana Wickrama Padakkama, Sri Lankan decoration
 Radio with Pictures, New Zealand programme
 Revolutionary Workers Party (disambiguation)
 Republic of West Papua, proposed state
 RWP, IATA code for Benazir Bhutto International Airport (defunct)
 RWP, IATA code for PAF Base Nur Khan